The 1998 Campionati Internazionali di Sicilia was a men's tennis tournament played on outdoor clay courts in Palermo, Italy that was part of the World Series of the 1998 ATP Tour. It was the seventeenth edition of the tournament and was held from 5 October until 11 October 1998. Unseeded Mariano Puerta won the singles title.

Finals

Singles

 Mariano Puerta defeated  Franco Squillari, 6–3, 6–2
 It was Puerta's first singles title of his career.

Doubles

 Donald Johnson /  Francisco Montana defeated  Pablo Albano /  Daniel Orsanic, 6–4, 7–6

References

External links
 ITF tournament edition details

Campionati Internazionali di Sicilia
Campionati Internazionali di Sicilia
Campionati Internazionali di Sicilia